Emil Gröner (25 March 1892 – 12 December 1944) was a German international footballer and coach.

References

1892 births
1944 deaths
Association football forwards
German footballers
Germany international footballers